The Carpentarian grasswren (Amytornis dorotheae) is a species of bird in the family Maluridae.
It is endemic to Australia.

Its natural habitat is subtropical or tropical dry shrubland. It is threatened by habitat loss. The habitat of this species is almost exclusively on top of sandstone escarpments in the Northern Territory. In this very difficult to access terrain it is found to be not so rare. This habitat is not endangered by human encroachment other than by fires because of the extreme inaccessibility.

Taxonomy and systematics 
The species was formerly considered to be conspecific with the white-throated grasswren. It is monotypic.

Behaviour and ecology

Diet 
Feeds on insects and seeds. Forages by searching rock crevices and litter under shrubs on the ground.

References

Carpentarian grasswren
Birds of the Northern Territory
Endemic birds of Australia
Carpentarian grasswren
Taxonomy articles created by Polbot